The men's trap shooting competition at the 2000 Summer Olympics was held on 16 and 17 September at the Sydney International Shooting Centre. There were 41 competitors from 29 nations, with each nation having up to three shooters. By defending his title from Atlanta, Michael Diamond won the host country's only gold medal in the shooting competitions. Diamond was the second man to successfully defend an Olympic title in the trap (after Luciano Giovannetti of Italy in 1980 and 1984). Ian Peel earned Great Britain's first men's trap medal since 1968. Italy's Giovanni Pellielo earned bronze.

Background

This was the 18th appearance of the men's ISSF Olympic trap event. The event was held at every Summer Olympics from 1896 to 1924 (except 1904, when no shooting events were held) and from 1952 to 2016; it was open to women from 1968 to 1992.

Three of the 6 finalists from the 1996 Games (the three medalists) returned: gold medalist Michael Diamond of Australia and Americans silver medalist Josh Lakatos and bronze medalist Lance Bade. Diamond was also the reigning World Champion, winning in 1999 after silver medals in 1991 and 1995. Three-time World Champion (1995–1997) Giovanni Pellielo, the first man to score a perfect 125-target qualifying round, was a contender to unseat Diamond. Bade had also hit a perfect qualifying round. (Diamond would eventually do so, but not until 2012.)

Bosnia and Herzegovina, Russia, Slovenia, and the United Arab Emirates each made their debut in the event. Great Britain made its 17th appearance, most among nations, having missed only the 1980 Moscow Games.

Competition format

The competition used the two-round 125+25 format introduced in 1996. The qualifying round consisted of 125 targets (in 5 series of 25, held over two days with 3 series the first day and 2 series the second). The top six shooters advanced to the final. The final was a single series of 25 targets; the total score over all 6 series (150 targets) determined the winner. Shoot-offs were used as necessary to break ties for qualifying for the final and in the final.

Records

The existing world and Olympic records were as follows.

No new world or Olympic records were set during the competition.

Schedule

Results

Qualifying round

The qualifying round comprised 75 targets on day 1, and 50 targets on day 2.

Final

References

Sources

Shooting at the 2000 Summer Olympics
Trap at the Olympics
Men's events at the 2000 Summer Olympics